The Shri Mandodari temple is in the village of Betki, about 5 km from Marcel, Ponda in Goa, India. The temple is located at 81 ft elevation.

Deity
This is a temple for Mandodari the gramadevata or the village deity of Betki. It is not a temple for Ravana's wife Mandodari.

The name "Mandodari" is from the words mand (water) and udar (stomach). It means someone who is born in the water. This temple was built to worship the great human beings whose children were sacrificed in the past to ensure that this village had a flowing stream of water. There is no well water in Betki village so the main source of water in this area is streams.  This is how the village started worshiping this deity.

Shree Mandodari Devasthan completed 102 years of its constitution in 2013 but is of far more ancient foundation.

References

Further reading
 How Betki's child goddess and her brother rose to be forces of nature, by Rajendra P Kerkar, Times of India, 21 Oct 2018
Critical Themes in Environmental History of India, ed. Ranjan Chakrabarti, Indian Council of Historical Research / SAGE Publication 2020: New Delhi  (online version)

External links
 BharatTemples.com: Mandodari Temple, Betki
 TempleConnect.com: Shree Mandodari Temple (with photos)
 TemplesofIndia.org: Mandodari Temple, Goa

Hindu temples in South Goa district